Jane Lew is a town in Lewis County, West Virginia, United States. The population was 409 at the time of the 2020 census.

History
The community was named after Jane Lew, the mother of the original owner of the town site.

Geography
Jane Lew is located at  (39.109203, -80.407624), along Hackers Creek in northern Lewis County.

Demographics

2010 census
As of the census of 2010, there were 409 people, 195 households, and 111 families living in the town. The racial makeup of the town was 98.8% White, 0.2% Native American, 0.2% Asian, and 0.7% from two or more races. Hispanic or Latino of any race were 0.2% of the population.

There were 195 households, of which 24.1% had children under the age of 18 living with them, 42.6% were married couples living together, 10.8% had a female householder with no husband present, 3.6% had a male householder with no wife present, and 43.1% were non-families. 38.5% of all households were made up of individuals, and 19% had someone living alone who was 65 years of age or older. The average household size was 2.10 and the average family size was 2.72.

The median age in the town was 41.8 years. 19.3% of residents were under the age of 18; 8.2% were between the ages of 18 and 24; 24.5% were from 25 to 44; 30.5% were from 45 to 64; and 17.6% were 65 years of age or older. The gender makeup of the town was 47.4% male and 52.6% female.

2000 census
As of the census of 2000, there were 406 people, 209 households, and 117 families living in the town. The population density was 1,635.2 inhabitants per square mile (627.0/km2). There were 220 housing units at an average density of 886.1 per square mile (339.8/km2). The racial makeup of the town was 98.03% White, 0.25% Native American, and 1.72% from two or more races. Hispanic or Latino of any race were 1.23% of the population.

There were 209 households, out of which 17.7% had children under the age of 18 living with them, 40.7% were married couples living together, 11.0% had a female householder with no husband present, and 44.0% were non-families. 40.7% of all households were made up of individuals, and 18.7% had someone living alone who was 65 years of age or older. The average household size was 1.94 and the average family size was 2.58.

In the town, the population was spread out, with 15.0% under the age of 18, 7.9% from 18 to 24, 28.8% from 25 to 44, 24.6% from 45 to 64, and 23.6% who were 65 years of age or older. The median age was 44 years. For every 100 females, there were 84.5 males. For every 100 females age 18 and over, there were 79.7 males.

The median income for a household in the town was $23,571, and the median income for a family was $30,000. Males had a median income of $29,464 versus $16,667 for females. The per capita income for the town was $16,540. About 5.3% of families and 7.9% of the population were below the poverty line, including 2.9% of those under age 18 and 11.5% of those age 65 or over.

Notable people 

 May H. Gilruth, artist and painter
 Patrick S. Martin, member of the West Virginia Senate
 Joseph Marcellus McWhorter, lawyer, jurist, and politician
 William Neely, actor and writer
 Chub Watson, basketball player for Davis & Elkins College and Marshall University

Climate
The climate in this area is characterized by relatively high temperatures and evenly distributed precipitation throughout the year. According to the Köppen Climate Classification system, Jane Lew has a Humid subtropical climate, abbreviated "Cfa" on climate maps.

Education 
Jane Lew Elementary School. Jane Lew used to have a high school in operation (Jane Lew High School) from 1912 until 1966, when it consolidated with two another local schools to make Lewis County High School. Jane Lew High also won a West Virginia state boys basketball championship in 1922.

References

External links

Towns in Lewis County, West Virginia
Towns in West Virginia